Ri Ho-jun (born 1 December 1946) was a North Korean sports shooter and Olympic Champion. He won a gold medal in the 50 metre rifle prone event at the 1972 Summer Olympics in Munich, the country's first ever Olympic gold medal. In August 1972 he was awarded the title of Merited Master of Sport of the USSR. He also competed at the 1976 Summer Olympics and the 1980 Summer Olympics.

Ri also taught shooting sports to North Korea's future leader, Kim Jong-il. Ri later became his closest bodyguard.

References

External links

1946 births
Living people
North Korean male sport shooters
ISSF rifle shooters
Olympic shooters of North Korea
Olympic gold medalists for North Korea
Shooters at the 1972 Summer Olympics
Shooters at the 1976 Summer Olympics
Shooters at the 1980 Summer Olympics
Olympic medalists in shooting
Medalists at the 1972 Summer Olympics
Asian Games medalists in shooting
Honoured Masters of Sport of the USSR
Shooters at the 1974 Asian Games
Shooters at the 1978 Asian Games
People's Athletes
Asian Games gold medalists for North Korea
Asian Games silver medalists for North Korea
Medalists at the 1974 Asian Games
Medalists at the 1978 Asian Games
Bodyguards